Melosperma is a genus of flowering plants belonging to the family Plantaginaceae.

Its native range is Southern South America.

Species
Species:
 Melosperma andicola Benth.

References

Plantaginaceae
Plantaginaceae genera